73rd Regiment or 73rd Infantry Regiment may refer to:

 73rd Regiment of Foot (disambiguation), several units with of the British Army
 73rd Heavy Anti-Aircraft Regiment, Royal Artillery, a unit of the British Territorial Force
 73rd Light Anti-Aircraft Regiment, Royal Artillery, a unit of the British Army
 73rd Cavalry Regiment, a regiment of the US Army
 73rd Field Artillery Regiment, a regiment of the US Army
 73rd Infantry Regiment (France), a former unit of the French Army

American Civil War:
 73rd Illinois Volunteer Infantry Regiment, a unit of the Union (Northern) Army 
 73rd Indiana Infantry Regiment, a unit of the Union (Northern) Army 
 73rd New York Volunteer Infantry Regiment, a unit of the Union (Northern) Army 
 73rd Ohio Infantry, a unit of the Union (Northern) Army 
 73rd Pennsylvania Infantry, a unit of the Union (Northern) Army

See also
73rd Division (disambiguation)